Prosartes trachycarpa, the roughfruit fairybells,  rough-fruited fairybells or rough-fruited mandarin, is a North American species of plants in the lily family. The species is widespread, known from British Columbia to Ontario and south to Arizona and New Mexico. One isolated population was reported from Isle Royale in Lake Superior.

The flowers are delicate and hang down. The berry is larger than a Saskatoon, pincherry or chokecherry, about the size of a grocery store cherry or small grape. The rough-fruited fairybell can be found in the same locale as other native fruits such as Saskatoons and chokecherries. The surface of the fruit feels fuzzy and velvety.

The images of the rough-fruited fairy bell here were photographed as one was climbing up the riverbank of the South Saskatchewan River, south of Saskatoon. The first nations ate fairybells, and a previous name was dog feet.

The specimen shown in the photograph, Prosartes trachycarpa (rough-fruited fairybell) was found in western Canada.  The species is listed amongst plants found in the Prince Albert National Park and Riding Mountain National Park and are considered a common range plant of northern Saskatchewan.

Uses
The berries have historically been eaten by Blackfeet Native Americans.

References

External links
Disporum trachycarpum Saskatchewan's wildflowers

Flora of North America
Plants described in 1871
trachycarpa